The year 1995 in archaeology involved some significant events.

Explorations
 The Theban Mapping Project makes the great size of the tomb KV5 apparent.

Excavations
 Neolithic ceremonial site of Göbekli Tepe in Turkey commenced under German archaeologist Klaus Schmidt.

Finds
 April - Submarine CSS H. L. Hunley (sunk in action 1864) is located in Charleston Harbor, South Carolina, by Clive Cussler and the National Underwater and Marine Agency after a 14-year search.
 July - French barque La Belle (sunk 1686) is located in Matagorda Bay, Texas.
 November - Submarine Resurgam (sunk 1880) is located off Rhyl, North Wales, by diver Keith Hurley.
 British transport ship SS Empire Heritage (torpedoed in 1944) is located off Tory Island, County Donegal.

Other events
The ancient sculptures database Arachne is started.
American installation artist Mark Dion first transforms archaeological investigation into an art exhibit with his History Trash Dig at Fribourg, Switzerland.

Publications
 Tim Cornell – The Beginnings of Rome: Italy and Rome from the Bronze Age to the Punic Wars.

Deaths
 September 12 - Grahame Clark, English archaeologist (b. 1907).
 October 20 - Eric Birley, English archaeologist associated with the excavations of forts on Hadrian's Wall (b. 1906).

References

Archaeology
Archaeology by year
Archaeology